Wesley Brown is an American writer, playwright, and professor.  He is best known for his books Tragic Magic and Darktown Strutters.

Tragic Magic, Brown's first novel, received strong reviews.  Kirkus Reviews wrote that Brown's "sentences end in unexpected pretzels, they blurt and croon; his gift is improvisatory and brassy." James W. Coleman, writing in Black American Literature Forum,  thought that Brown did "a brilliant job of maintaining the tension and vitality of the novel's language, which is a genuine tour de force." The novel, about a young man just out of prison for refusing induction into the armed services, has been called a "jazz-narrative." Tragic Magic was edited by Toni Morrison, at Random House. The book was reissued in hardcover by McSweeney's in 2021, part of the publisher's "Of the Diaspora" series spotlighting important works in Black literature.

Brown published his second novel, about a minstrel show performer, in 1994. The New York Times praised Darktown Strutters, writing that by "combining the simple prose of a folk tale with the meta-psychology of a philosopher, Wesley Brown has created a vivid, disturbing work of the historical imagination." Life During Wartime, Brown's 1992 play, was called a "complex, intelligent and thought-provoking drama" by the Times.

He has served as a judge for the PEN/Faulkner Award.

Brown has taught at Rutgers University and Bard College at Simon's Rock.

Selected bibliography
 Tragic Magic (1978) (Reissued 2021, McSweeney's; hardcover , with a new introduction by the author)
 Boogie Woogie and Booker T (1987)
 Life During Wartime (1992)
 Darktown Strutters (1994)
 Push Comes to Shove (2009)
 Dance of the Infidels (2017)

References

African-American novelists
20th-century American novelists
American male novelists
Year of birth missing (living people)
Living people
20th-century American male writers
20th-century African-American writers
21st-century African-American people
African-American male writers